Munger is an unincorporated community in Pike County, Illinois, United States. The location is adjacent to the Pike-Adams county line on the Mississippi floodplain two miles east of the Mississippi River and northeast of East Hannibal. Fall Creek is approximately 1.5 miles to the northeast. The Burlington Northern Railroad line passes by the community.

Notes

Unincorporated communities in Pike County, Illinois
Unincorporated communities in Illinois